Mehola is a religious moshav and Israeli settlement in the West Bank. Located in the Jordan Valley near the Green Line and the Palestinian village of Bardala, it falls under the jurisdiction of Bik'at HaYarden Regional Council.

The international community considers Israeli settlements in the West Bank illegal under international law, but the Israeli and US governments dispute this.

History
The village was established in 1967 by Bnei Akiva members. It was named after the biblical city of Abel-meholah, which was located in the area.

The inhabitants of Mehola cultivate some of the village lands of the depopulated Palestinian village of Al-Fatur.

In 1993, it was the site of Mehola Junction bombing.

In June 2012, the outpost Givat Sal'it in the northern Jordan Valley was retroactively legalised by redesignating it as a neighbourhood of Mehola, from which it is separated by a major inter-city highway.

See also 
Shadmot Mehola

References

External links

 

Moshavim
Religious Israeli settlements
Populated places established in 1967
1967 establishments in the Israeli Military Governorate
Israeli settlements in the West Bank